Ellangowan is a locality in the Toowoomba Region, Queensland, Australia.

Geography 
The Condamine River forms the south-east boundary of the locality with Sandy Camp and then flows through the locality where it forms part of its northern boundary with Felton South. The land has been developed for agriculture with both cropping and grazing. The Toowoomba–Karara Road (State Route 48) runs through from north to south.

History 
The locality is named after the property of John Thane who established it in 1842.

Ellangowan Provisional School opened on 12 August 1885. On 1 January 1909 it became Ellangowan State School. It closed in 1917, but reopened briefly in 1922 as a half-time school in conjunction with Tooth State School (meaning the two schools shared one teacher). In 1924 it reopened again as a half-time school in conjunction with Strathane State School. Following the permanent closure of Strathane State School in 1927, Ellangowan State School became a full-time school again. Due to low students numbers, it closed in 1952. In 1958 it reopened and then closed finally in 1967. 

Strathane Provisional opened circa 1898. On 1 January 1909 it became Strathane State School. In 1924 it became a full-time school with Ellangowan State School (they shared the teacher between the two schools). Due to low attendances, it closed in late 1926 or early 1927.

References 

Toowoomba Region
Localities in Queensland